Eduardo Manuel Gámez Piña (born 30 May 1991) is a Mexican professional footballer who plays as a defensive midfielder for Liga de Balompié Mexicano club Neza FC.

References 

1991 births
Living people
Footballers from Mexico City
Mexican footballers
Lobos BUAP footballers
Atlético Reynosa footballers

Association footballers not categorized by position